The Crișul Pietros (Romanian for: "stony Criș") is a right tributary of the river Crișul Negru in Romania. Upstream from its confluence with the Boga it is called Valea Galbena. It discharges into the Crișul Negru in Drăgănești.

Tributaries

The following rivers are tributaries to the Crișul Pietros:

Left: Lazu
Right: Boga, Valea Mare Cărpinoasa, Runc, Inaru, Valea Leurdei

References

Rivers of Romania
Rivers of Bihor County